This is a list of Mexican films released in 2002.

2002

External links

List of 2002 box office number-one films in Mexico

References

2002
Films
Mexican